East Patel Nagar is a region of West Delhi. It covers the eastern part of the Patel Nagar area. Among the three divisions of Municipal Corporation of Delhi, North, South and East, East Patel Nagar falls under Municipal Corporation of Delhi-North.

Area
The PIN Code of East Patel Nagar is 110008. This area is surrounded by the following colonies:

Rajendra Place – east
South Patel Nagar – south
Ranjit Nagar – south
West Patel Nagar – west
Rajendra Nagar – southeast
Prasad Nagar – northeast

The main hospital in the region is Sardar Patel Hospital, a government facility. B.L.Kapoor Memorial Hospital is another hospital that is very close to East Patel Nagar.

Jaypee Siddharth Hotel is a five star hotel located at one end of East Patel Nagar.

The main cinema hall in this region is Satyam Cineplex in West Patel Nagar region. There used to be another hall in the region by the name of Vivek Cinema, which was demolished to construct the Patel Nagar Metro Station. There is another hall by the name of Rachna in the Rajendra Place region, but it has not been operational for several years.

Metro station
There are two metro stations in or near East Patel Nagar: Patel Nagar and Rajendra Place. Patel Nagar Metro Station is suitable for traveling to some parts of South, East, and West Patel Nagar.

Rajendra Place Metro Station is suitable for travelling to Rajendra Place, Rajendra Nagar, eastern part of East and South Patel Nagar.

Politics 

East Patel Nagar comes under the jurisdiction of New Delhi Lok Sabha Constituency. The current MP is Meenakshi Lekhi of the Bhartiya Janata Party.

As far as Vidhan Sabha is concerned, East Patel Nagar falls under Patel Nagar constituency. The current MLA is Raaj Kumar Anand of the Aam Aadmi Party. He succeeded Hazari Lal Chauhan, who also was a part of Aam Aadmi Party.

References

Neighbourhoods in Delhi
West Delhi district
Delhi Legislative Assembly